The Military ranks of Yemen are the military insignia used by the Republic of Yemen Armed Forces.

Commissioned officer ranks
The rank insignia for commissioned officers.

Other ranks
The rank insignia for non-commissioned officers and enlisted peresonnel.

References

External links
 
 
 
 

Yemen
Military of Yemen
Yemen